Pyomyoma is a pyogenous infection of a leiomyoma (preexisting benign uterine tumor). It is a rare, yet potentially fatal complication of uterine leiomyoma. Ultrasound of the pelvis, CT or MRI scan of the pelvis, Septic screen—FBC/CRP, blood cultures, urine cultures, high vaginal swab can be used in diagnosis.

References
  T. Mason, J. Adair, Y.C. Lee, "Postpartum Pyomyoma", Journal of the National Medical Association, June 2005

Anatomical pathology